The 1962 Algerian crisis was a period of political unrest that happened after Algeria gained independence from France on 5 July 1962. It was a power struggle between factions within the National Liberation Front. It involved the Provisional Government of the Algerian Republic (Tizi Ouzou group) headed by Benyoucef Benkhedda against the Oujda Group (Tlemcen group) headed by Ahmed Ben Bella.

Events 
The crisis began after disagreements over the Tripoli Program, a document which analysed Algeria's colonial heritage and the situation facing it after independence. The controversy in the program was the section which attacked the GPRA for its mismanagement of the FLN during the Algerian war. No agreement was reached on the composition of the Political Bureau, but Ahmed Ben Bella proposed a list of seven of his supporters and included none of the prominent GPRA members, which never came to vote. The two rival groups formed after the GPRA tried to break up the coalition of its opponents by dismissing three top officers of the National Liberation Army including Houari Boumédiène. This created an alliance between the General Staff and Ben Bella who denounced the GPRA decision. Ferhat Abbas also joined the Oujda group after he was ousted as president of the GPRA by Benkhedda.

On July 11, Ahmed Ben Bella entered Algeria from Morocco and took control over western Algeria. He set up his headquarters at Tlemcen and gave a speech at Oran, and after this the Oujda group was known as the Tlemcen group. Benyoucef Benkhedda also entered Algeria and set up his headquarters at Tizi Ouzou, stronghold of Algeria's Berber minority, and his group was known as the Tizi Ouzou group. Ben Bella announced the constitution of the Political Bureau on July 22.

Some observers believed that the ideological differences between the Tlemcen group and Tizi Ouzou group were that the Tlemcen group wanted a radical socialist state or military dictatorship while the Tizi Ouzou group wanted Western democracy and close cooperation with France. Some observers even believed that it was a conflict between Arabs and Berbers because the Tlemcen group was entirely Arab whilst the Tizi Ouzou group had large numbers of Kabyles. Ideological differences were denied by the National Liberation Front on July 13.

Fighting broke out near Constantine on July 25 between Si Larbi (supporter of the Tlemcen group) and Saout el-Arab (supporter of the Tizi Ouzou group), and on the same day the commander of Wilaya III (Kabylia) declared that he would not recognize the authority of the Political Bureau. This resulted in 25 dead and 30 wounded. The commanders of Wilaya V (Oran), Wilaya I (Aurès) and Wilaya VI (Sahara) gave their support to the Tlemcen group because of their close contact with the Oujda group's frontier army during the Algerian war, however Wilaya II (Constantinois), Wilaya III (Kabylia) and Wilaya IV (Algiers) sided with the Tizi Ouzou group. The Wilaya leaders met in Tripoli to work out a common position but failed.

Boumédiène slowly advanced from Tunisia and Morocco towards Algiers, and on July 28 Benkhedda announced that the GPRA agreed to accept the composition of the Political Bureau proposed at the Tripoli Conference. On September 4, Ben Bella appeared in Algiers and declared that the crisis ended. Boumédiène advanced towards the capital of Wilaya IV at the cost of killing hundreds of members of the National Liberation Army and entered Algiers on September 9. This assured the victory of the Political Bureau (Tlemcen group). In the Constituent Assembly election on 28 September, Ben Bella's cabinet was approved by 99.6% of the voters. Ferhat Abbas was elected president of the Assembly with Ahmed ben Bella as prime minister. Ben Bella's new regime still did not have complete control over Algeria because Kabylia was still controlled by Wilaya forces and Si Larbi still did not surrender his lands in Constantine region.

References 

1962 in Algeria
National Liberation Front (Algeria)
Conflicts in 1962